Mark Jeremy Seymour (born 26 July 1956) is an Australian musician and vocalist. He was the frontman and songwriter of rock band Hunters & Collectors  from 1981 until 1998. Seymour has carved a solo career, releasing his debut solo album in 1997 and winning an ARIA Award in 2001 for One Eyed Man in the category of Best Adult Contemporary Album.

Early years
Mark Jeremy Seymour was born on 26 July 1956 in Benalla to Frank and Paula Seymour. He has two older sisters, Hilary and Helen, and a younger brother, Nick (born 1958) – later bass guitarist for Crowded House. His mother encouraged all four children to learn musical instruments and sing. He initially learned piano but switched to guitar as a teenager. Seymour and his family moved to Melbourne in 1972. He graduated from University of Melbourne in 1978 and was qualified to teach. He later lived in the St Kilda area.

Career

1980: The Jetsonnes
By 1980 Seymour, on lead guitar, was a member of The Jetsonnes, a post-punk pop group formed in Melbourne, with John Archer on bass guitar; Doug Falconer on drums; Margot O'Neill on lead vocals; and Ray Tosti-Gueira on guitar. Clinton Walker described the group as "lighter, bouncier (rather than funkier) and more infectious than other like-minded bands such as Models". They issued a double A-sided single, "Newspaper"/"Miniskirts in Moscow". The Jetsonnes, Models, and International Exiles were "the first bands to rise out of Melbourne's hothouse punk, new wave explosion playing an exuberant brand of neo-pop".

1981–1998: Hunters and Collectors

In 1981, Seymour formed Hunters & Collectors from the remnants of The Jetsonnes with Archer, Falconer, and Tosti-Gueira. According to musicologist, Ian McFarlane, this was "a far more radical and unremitting concept" and Seymour, with his "blue labourer's singlet, bulging biceps, introspective angst and impassioned vocals" became the "thinking woman's sex symbol".

Between 1981 and 1998, The Hunters and Collectors released nine studio albums, and were inducted into the ARIA Hall of Fame in 2005.

In 1992, Seymour released his debut single, "Hey Boys" with Paul Kelly from the Garbo (soundtrack). The song peaked at number 71 on the ARIA Charts.

Seymour wrote the Hunters and Collector's song "Holy Grail", which although not intended to be about sport, has been widely used in television broadcasts of Australian Football League matches, especially the AFL Grand Final. It was also used by the Queensland cricket team in the years leading up to its first Sheffield Shield win in 1995. Seymour has performed at several AFL Grand Finals.

1997–2010: Solo career
In May 1997, whilst still officially part of Hunters and Collectors, Seymour released his first solo single, "Last Ditch Cabaret". The song peaked at number 85 on the ARIA Charts. At the ARIA Music Awards of 1997, the song earned him two nominations; Best Male Artist and Breakthrough Single. "The Ghost Of Vainglory" and "Home Again" followed and Seymour released his debut studio album King Without a Clue in September 1997. The album peaked at number 53 on the ARIA charts and earned Seymour another nomination for Best Male Artist at the ARIA Music Awards of 1998.

In March 2001, Seymour released his second studio album, One Eyed Man, which peaked at number 61 on the ARIA Charts and won Best Adult Contemporary Album at the ARIA Music Awards of 2001.

In April 2004, Seymour released Embedded. The album did not chart. In September 2005, Seymour released Daytime & the Dark, an album, featuring acoustic versions of mostly Hunters and Collectors songs. The album peaked at number 99 on the ARIA Charts. In September 2007, Seymour released Titanic, a second album of acoustic versions of mostly Hunters and Collectors songs.

2011–present: Mark Seymour & The Undertow 
In 2011, Seymour formed and began recording and with a band again. The band, titled Mark Seymour & The Undertow released Undertow in May 2011.

In 2013, Mark Seymour & The Undertow released Seventh Heaven Club, an album which paid homage to love songs, featuring tracks by Bob Dylan, Dave Dobbyn, Otis Redding, Neil Young, Tom Petty and Lucinda Williams.

Mark Seymour & The Undertow released the album Roll Back The Stone on March 24, 2015. It was recorded live at Melbourne's Bakehouse Studios and featured 24 tracks from Seymour's back catalogue from 1985-2017 reinterpreted by The Undertow.

In 2020, Seymour released his tenth studio album (and fourth as Mark Seymour & The Undertow), titled Slow Dawn.

Personal life
Seymour married his wife Jo in 1994; they have two daughters Eva and Hannah.

Both of Seymour's parents and his two sisters were teachers, so following on from their careers Seymour became a teacher for about ten weeks but decided to focus on becoming a musician.

In 2008, Seymour released the memoir, Thirteen Tonne Theory, which was published by Penguin Books, detailing his experiences with Hunters and Collectors.

Seymour suffered an Achilles injury when he was 23 and has accumulated scar tissue on both knees.

Discography

Studio albums

Live albums

Compilation albums

Singles

Awards

ARIA Music Awards
The ARIA Music Awards is an annual awards ceremony that recognises excellence, innovation, and achievement across all genres of Australian music. Seymour has won one award from five nominations.

|-
| rowspan="2"| 1997
| rowspan="2"| "Last Ditch Cabaret"
| Best Male Artist
| 
|-
| ARIA Award for Breakthrough Artist – single
| 
|-
| 1998
| King Without a Clue
| Best Male Artist
| 
|-
| 2001
| One Eyed Man
| Best Adult Contemporary Album
| 
|-
| 2011
| Undertow
| Best Adult Contemporary Album
| 
|-

References

General
  Note: Archived [on-line] copy has limited functionality.
Specific

External links

1956 births
Living people
APRA Award winners
ARIA Award winners
Australian rock singers
Musicians from Melbourne
People from Benalla
Australian multi-instrumentalists
Australian rock guitarists
Australian singer-songwriters
Hunters & Collectors members
Australian male guitarists
Australian male singer-songwriters